Brothers in Arms may refer to:

Literature 
 Brothers in Arms (Bujold novel), a novel by Lois McMaster Bujold
 Brothers in Arms (Dragonlance novel), a Raistlin Chronicles novel by Margaret Weis and Don Perrin
 Brothers in Arms, a 2004 young adult novel in The Bluford Series by Paul Langan and Ben Alirez
 Brothers in Arms, a title in the comics series Star Wars: Clone Wars
 Brothers in Arms: A Novel, a novel by Hans Hellmut Kirst

Music 
 Brothers in Arms (album), by Dire Straits, 1985
 "Brothers in Arms" (song), the title song
 Brothers in Arms, an album by Joan Baez, 1991
 "Brothers in Arms", a song composed by Martin O'Donnell and Michael Salvatori from Halo Original Soundtrack, 2002
 "Brothers in Arms", a song by Bon Jovi from 2020
 "Brothers in Arms", a song by Junkie XL from the Mad Max: Fury Road film soundtrack, 2015

Television and film 
 "Brothers in Arms" (Arrow), an episode of Arrow
 "Brothers in Arms" (Defiance), an episode of Defiance
 "Brothers in Arms" (Highlander), an episode of Highlander: The Series
 "Brothers in Arms" (NCIS), an episode of NCIS
 "Brothers in Arms" (Robin Hood), an episode of Robin Hood
 Universal Soldier II: Brothers in Arms, a 1999 television movie sequel to the 1992 film Universal Soldier
 Bikie Wars: Brothers in Arms, a 2012 Australian television drama mini-series

Video games 
 Brothers in Arms (video game series), a video game series by Gearbox software
 Brothers in Arms: Road to Hill 30, the 2005 first game in the series
 Brothers in Arms: Earned in Blood, the sequel of the first game, released several months after the original
 Brothers in Arms: Hell's Highway, third instalment of the series
 Brothers in Arms (2008 video game)

Sports 
 The Shield (professional wrestling) (also known as the Brothers in Arms), a wrestling trio comprising Dean Ambrose, Seth Rollins and Roman Reigns